Norman Young is an American former Negro league infielder who played in the 1940s.

Young played for the New York Black Yankees in 1941 and for the Kansas City Monarchs in 1944. In his 21 recorded career games, he posted 12 hits and four RBI in 68 plate appearances.

References

External links
 and Seamheads

Year of birth missing
Place of birth missing
Kansas City Monarchs players
New York Black Yankees players